Eosia is a genus of moths in the family Saturniidae first described by Ferdinand Le Cerf in 1911.

Species
Eosia insignis Le Cerf, 1911

References

Saturniinae